IRCnet is currently the third largest IRC network with around 25,000 users using it daily. An early 2005 record had approximately 123,110 users simultaneously connected to the network.

History

Initially, most IRC servers formed a single IRC network, to which new servers could join without restriction, but this was soon abused by people who set up servers to sabotage other users, channels, or servers. In August 1990, the server eris.berkeley.edu remained the only one to allow anyone to connect to the servers.

A group of IRC server operators, with the support of Jarkko Oikarinen, introduced a new "Q-line" into their server configurations, to "quarantine" themselves away from eris by disconnecting from any subset of the IRC network as soon as they saw eris there.

For a few days, the entire IRC network suffered frequent netsplits, but eventually the majority of servers added the Q-line and effectively created a new separate IRC net called EFnet (Eris-Free Network); the remaining servers who stayed connected to eris (and thus were no longer able to connect to EFnet servers) were called A-net (Anarchy Network). A-net soon vanished, leaving EFnet as the only IRC network.

Continuing problems with performance and abuse eventually led to the rise of another major IRC network, Undernet, which split off in October 1992.

Between May and July 1996 IRCnet was formed as a European fork of EFnet, when a number of operator disagreements resulted in a group of European admins declaring their independence. The reasons for the "Great Split" as it came to be called, included:
 a policy disagreement about how much power system operators should have. IRCnet formed with the basis that there should be a set of rules defining what SysOps could and could not do. This viewpoint was opposed by many of the US-based EFnet servers.
 a technical disagreement on whether the network should use timestamping (TS) or Nick Delay as a means to prevent nick collisions, according to Jarkko Oikarinen.
 Vegard Engen, one of the European operators, stated that the immediate cause for the "Great Split" was that a major US EFnet hub had been disconnecting irc.stealth.net without warning, and thereby breaking the link to the European servers.

Characteristics 
Many IRCnet servers state that "IRC is a privilege, not a right". That defines the characteristics of network usage ‒ users are normally not permitted to run bots and should avoid abusive behaviour.

Servers are generally open to users from their geographic location and do not allow outside connections, however, there are few open exceptions allowing access to users not covered by any local server.

Strict rules are operated for shell providers regulating, limiting or banning their connections.

IRCnet operates few if any network services to service nicknames or channels. It does implement reop -channelmode that allows channel operators to set hostmasks for users to be automatically "reopped" by the server. This mode is called +R with capital R
and supersedes the RFC2811 +r (lower-case r) channel mode, available only on !-channels and settable (not resettable) only by their creators.

All network servers run on IRCnet's ircd with the current version 2.11 (the latest software versions are maintained at IRC.ORG).

IRCnet's channel operators are generally free to run their channels however they see fit without the intervention of IRC operators. IRCops are primarily there to handle network and server-related issues, and rarely get involved with channel-level issues.

To fight nickname collisions when splits occur on re-link IRCnet will use unique IDs. If there are two users with the same nickname on both sides of the network when servers are re-linking then both nicknames will be forcefully changed to unique ID instead to prevent collisions.

References

External links 
 IRCnet.com (unofficial) (up to 2019)
 IRCnet.org (unofficial) (up to 2004)
 IRCnet.info (unofficial) (up to 2018)
 Complete IRCnet server list
 IRCnet server map

Internet Relay Chat networks
Internet properties established in 1996